This list of the Paleozoic life of Oklahoma contains the various prehistoric life-forms whose fossilized remains have been reported from within the US state of Oklahoma and are between 541 and 252.17 million years of age.

A

 †Abludoglyptocrinus
 †Abyssocrinus
 †Abyssocrinus antiquus
 †Abyssomedon – type locality for genus
 †Abyssomedon williamsi – type locality for species
 †Acanthobolbina
 †Acanthobolbina loeblichi
 †Acanthocladia
 †Acanthocladia ouachitensis
 †Acanthocrania
 †Acanthocrania erecta
 †Acanthocrania oklahomensis
 †Acanthocrania subquadrata
 †Acanthopecten
 †Acanthopecten grandis – type locality for species
 †Acanthospirina
 †Acanthotriletes
   †Acheloma
 †Acheloma cumminsi – or unidentified comparable form
 †Acheloma dunni – type locality for species
 †Acidiphorus
 †Acidiphorus williamsi – or unidentified comparable form
   †Acleistorhinus – type locality for genus
 †Acleistorhinus pteroticus – type locality for species
 †Acolocrinus
 †Acolocrinus crinerensis
 †Actinotodissus
 †Actinotodissus longitaleosus
 †Adairia
 †Adairia adairensis – type locality for species
 †Adornofusa
 †Adornofusa microhapsis
 †Aechmina
 †Aechmina geneae
 †Aechmina longispina
 †Aechmina truncata – tentative report
 †Aechminaria
 †Aechminaria ambigua
 †Aechminaria longispina
 †Aechminaria truncata – tentative report
 †Aechminella
 †Aechminella buchanani – type locality for species
 †Aechminella trispinosa – type locality for species
 †Affinocrinus
 †Affinocrinus grandis – type locality for species
 †Affinocrinus normalis
 †Affinocrinus orbis – type locality for species
 †Affinocrinus politus – type locality for species
 †Affinocrinus progressus – type locality for species
 †Alatisporites
 †Alatisporites pustulatus
 †Albertoceras
 †Albertoceras minimum
 †Alcimocrinus
 †Alcimocrinus girtyi
  †Alethopteris
 †Alethopteris ambigua
 †Alethopteris lesquereuxii
 †Alethopteris serlii
 †Alethopteris sullivantii
 †Alexandrinia
 †Alexandrinia directa – type locality for species
 †Alisporites
 †Alisporites aequus – type locality for species
 †Alisporites zapfei
 †Allocrinus
 †Allocrinus divergens
 †Allocrinus globulus
 †Allocrinus irroratus
 †Alloiopteris
 †Allorisma
 †Allorisma albequus
 †Allorisma maynardwhitei – type locality for species
 †Allorisma snideri – type locality for species
 †Allotropiophyllum – or unidentified comparable form
 †Amarixys
 †Amarixys gracilis
 †Amaurotoma – tentative report
 †Amaurotoma knighti – type locality for species
 †Ameura
 †Ameura major
 Ammobaculites
 Ammodiscus
 †Ammovertella
 †Ammovertella inversa
 †Ampelocrinus
 †Ampelocrinus convexus
 †Amphilichas
 †Amphilichas subpunctatus
 †Amphipsalidocrinus
 †Amphiscapha
 †Amphiscapha catilloides
 †Amphisella
 †Amphissites
 †Amphissites bradfieldi – type locality for species
 †Amphissites bushi – type locality for species
 †Amphissites marginiferus
 †Amphissites miseri – type locality for species
 †Amphissites nodosus
 †Amphissites rugosus
 †Amphissites wapanuckensis
 †Amphistrophia
 †Amphistrophia prolongata
 †Amsdenina
 †Amsdenoides
 †Amygdalocystites
 †Amygdalocystites florealis
 †Amygdalocystites tribrachiatus
 †Anabathra
 †Anabathra pulcherrima
 †Anachoropteris
 †Anachoropteris gillotii
 †Anachoropteris involuta
 †Anachroropteris
 †Anachroropteris involuta
 †Ananaspis
 †Ananaspis guttulus
 †Anapiculatasporites
 †Anapiculatasporites spinosus
 †Anapiculatisporites
 †Anapiculatisporites edgarensis
 †Anapiculatisporites spinosus
 †Anaplanisporites
 †Anasobella
 †Anastrophia
 †Anastrophia delicata
 †Anastrophia grossa – type locality for species
 †Anataphrus
 †Anataphrus kermiti – type locality for species
 †Anatiferocystis
 †Anatiferocystis papillata
 †Anchicrinus
 †Anchicrinus echinosacculus – type locality for species
 †Anchicrinus planulatus – type locality for species
 †Anchicrinus rugosus
 †Ancistrorhyncha
 †Ancistrorhyncha costata
 †Ancistrorhyncha globularis
 †Ancoradella
 †Ancoradella ploeckensis
 †Anematina
 †Angelosaurus
 †Angelosaurus romeri – type locality for species
 †Anguisporites
 †Anguisporites contortus – type locality for species
 †Anguisporites intonsus – type locality for species
 † Anisophyllum
   †Annularia
 †Annularia sphenophylloides
 †Annularia stellata
 †Anobasicrinus
 †Anobasicrinus obscurus
 †Anolotichia
 †Anolotichia deckeri
 †Anolotichia impolita
 †Anolotichia spinulifera
 †Anomalogramma
 †Anomalogramma parva
 †Anomalohymen – type locality for genus
 †Anomalohymen dochmus – type locality for species
 †Anomalorthis
 †Anomalorthis oklahomensis
 †Anomphalus
 †Anthracoceras
 †Anthracoceras oklahomense – type locality for species
 †Anthracocrinus
 †Anthracocrinus primitivus
 †Anthraconeilo
 †Anthraconeilo taffiana
 †Anthracospirifer
 †Anthracospirifer opimus
 †Anthracotarbus – type locality for genus
 †Anthracotarbus hintoni – type locality for species
 †Anthyrsis
 †Antiquatonia
 †Antirhynchonella
 †Antirhynchonella thomasi
 †Anulocrinus
 †Anulocrinus drummuckensis – or unidentified related form
 †Apachella
 †Apachella capertoni – type locality for species
 †Aparchites
 †Aparchites maccoyii
 †Aparchites millepunctatus
 †Aparchites perforata
 †Aphlebia
 †Apianurus
 †Apiculatasporites
 †Apiculatasporites latigranifer
 †Apiculatasporites setulosus
 †Apiculatasporites spinulistratus
 †Apodasmocrinus
 †Apodasmocrinus daubei
 †Apographiocrinus
 †Apotocardium
 †Apotocardium lanterna
 †Apotocardium plautum
 †Apsidoneura
 †Apsidoneura flexa
 †Arakespongia – type locality for genus
 †Arakespongia mega – type locality for species
 †Araucarites
 †Arbucklecystis
   †Archaeocidaris
 †Archaeocidaris megastyla
 †Archaeocrinus
 †Archaeocrinus lacunosus – or unidentified comparable form
 †Archaeocrinus subglobosus
 †Archaeocrinus subovalis
 Archaeolithophyllum
 †Archaeophiomusium
 †Archaeophiomusium burrisi
 †Archaeoscyphia
 †Archaeoscyphia annulata
 †Archeria
 †Archeria victori – type locality for species
  †Archimedes
 †Archimedes ardmorensis – type locality for species
 †Archimedes distans
 †Archimedes meekanoides
 †Archimedes meekanus – or unidentified comparable form
 †Archimedes perminimus – or unidentified related form
 †Archimedes pitkinensis – type locality for species
 †Archimedes pseudoswallovanus – type locality for species
 †Archimedes sublaxus – or unidentified comparable form
 †Ardmosteges – type locality for genus
 †Ardmosteges orchamus – type locality for species
 †Arkacrinus
 †Arkacrinus constrictus – type locality for species
 †Arkacrinus dubius
 †Arkanites
 †Arkanites relictus
 †Arthropora
 †Arthropora simplex
 †Artinska
 †Artinska clara
 †Artinska ovata
 †Asaphocrinus
 †Asaphocrinus densus
 †Ascograptus
 †Asketopalla
 †Asketopalla formosula
 †Aspidosaurus – or unidentified comparable form
 †Astartella
 †Astartella concentrica
 †Astartella vera
 †Asterophyllites
 †Asthenohymen
 †Asthenohymen apicalis – type locality for species
 †Asthenohymen latus – type locality for species
 †Asthenohymen minutus – type locality for species
 †Asthenohymen parvulus – type locality for species
 †Asthenohymen triangularis – type locality for species
 †Astraeospongium
 †Astrocystites
 †Atactoporella
 †Atactoporella bellula
 †Atelelasma
 †Atelelasma oklahomense
 †Athlocrinus
 †Athlocrinus dejustus – type locality for species
 †Athyris
 †Atokacrinus
 †Atokacrinus tumulosus – type locality for species
 †Atrapocrinus – type locality for genus
 †Atrapocrinus mutatus – type locality for species
 †Atribonium
 †Atribonium evexum – or unidentified comparable form
  †Atrypa
 †Atrypa arctostriata
 †Atrypa oklahomensis
 †Atrypa tennesseensis
 †Atrypina
 †Atrypina hami
 †Aulacotheca – or unidentified comparable form
 †Aurimorpha
 †Aurimorpha varia
 †Auriptygma
 †Austinella
 †Austinella multicostella
  †Aviculopecten
 †Aviculopecten halensis
 †Aviculopecten multilineatus
 †Aviculopecten nodocosta – type locality for species
 †Aviculopecten tomlinsoni – type locality for species
 †Avonia – tentative report
 †Avonia snideri – type locality for species
 †Avonia spinosa – type locality for species
 †Axinolobus

B

 †Bactrites
 †Bactrites smithianus
 †Bactrocrinites
 †Bactrocrinites oklahomensis
 †Baeotherates – type locality for genus
 †Baeotherates fortsillensis – type locality for species
 †Baiosoma
 †Baiosoma batilia – type locality for species
 Bairdia
 †Bairdia ardmorensis – type locality for species
 †Bairdia billjohnsoni – type locality for species
 †Bairdia croneisi – type locality for species
 †Bairdia folgeri
 †Bairdia forakerensis
 †Bairdia multihilosa – type locality for species
 †Bairdiocypris
 †Bairdocypris – tentative report
 †Bairdocypris transversus
 †Balticella
 †Balticella deckeri
 †Balticella elongata
 †Baltisphaeridium
 †Baltisphaeridium accinctum
 †Baltisphaeridium bystrentos
 †Baltisphaeridium disparicanale
 †Baltisphaeridium parvigranosum
 †Baltisphaeridium trophirhapium
 †Barycrinus – tentative report
 †Barycrinus herculeus – or unidentified related form
 †Bascomella
 †Bascomella gigantea – or unidentified comparable form
 †Bathysiphon
 †Bathyurellus
 †Bathyurellus arbucklensis
 †Bathyurellus inflatus
 †Bathyurus
 †Bathyurus superbus
 †Batostoma
 †Batostoma chapparsi
 †Batostoma chazyensis
 †Batostoma cumingsi
 †Batostoma ramosa
 †Batostoma sheldonensis
 †Batostoma winchelli
 †Beecheria
 †Beedeina
 †Bellazona
 †Bellazona bella
  †Bellerophon
 †Bellerophon wewokanus
 †Bellimurina
 †Bellimurina compressa
 †Bellimurina subquadrata
 †Belodella
 †Belodella silurica
 †Benthamaspis
 †Benthamaspis mediacrista – or unidentified comparable form
 †Benthamaspis onomeris
 †Benthamaspis rhochmotis
 †Berestovia
 †Bicornella
 †Bicornella tricornis
 †Bicornella unicornis – type locality for species
 †Bigalea
 †Bilinguites
 †Bilinguites eliasi – type locality for species
 †Bisatoceras – type locality for genus
 †Bisatoceras primum – type locality for species
 †Bistomiacystis
 †Boesites
 †Boesites girtyi
 †Bolbocephalus
 †Bolbocephalus convexus – or unidentified comparable form
 †Bolbocephalus jeffersonensis
 †Bolbocephalus myktos
 †Bolbocephalus stitti
 †Bollia
    †Bolosaurus
 †Bolosaurus grandis – type locality for species
 †Bolosaurus striatus
 †Bolterpeton – type locality for genus
 †Bolterpeton carrolli – type locality for species
 †Borestus
 †Borestus pagoda – type locality for species
  †Bothriocidaris
 †Botryocrinus
 †Botryocrinus parcus
 †Botryopteris
 †Botryopteris forensis
 †Botryopteris mediatena
 †Botryopteris tridentata
 †Brabeocrinus
 †Brabeocrinus primus – type locality for species
 †Brachydegma – tentative report
 †Brachydegma caelatum
 †Brachymimulus
 †Brachymimulus americanus
 †Brachyprion
 †Brachyprion arata
 †Brachyprion attenuata
 †Brachyprion gibber
 †Brachyprion gibbera – type locality for species
 †Brachythyris
 †Brachythyris chouteauensis
 †Bradyina
 †Bransonella – type locality for genus
 †Bransonella tridentata – type locality for species
 †Breileenia
 †Breileenia minnewankensis
 †Brevilamnulella
 †Brevilamnulella thebesensis
 †Bromidechinus – type locality for genus
 †Bromidechinus rimaporus – type locality for species
 †Bromidella
 †Bromidella reticulata
 †Bromidocrinus
 †Bromidocystis
 †Buckhornia
 †Buckhornia carteri
 †Bumastoides
 †Bumastoides milleri – or unidentified comparable form
 †Buxtonia
 †Buxtonia incurvatus
 †Buxtonia semicircularis
 †Buxtonia suttoni – type locality for species
 Bythocypris
 †Bythocypris cylindrica
 †Bythocypris kershavii
 †Bythocypris spinosa
 †Bythocypris tomlinsoni
 †Bythopora
 †Bythopora subgracilis

C

   †Cacops
 †Cacops morrisi – type locality for species
 †Cacops woehri – type locality for species
 †Cadiospora
 †Cadiospora magna
 †Caenanoplia
 †Caenanoplia burlingtonensis
 †Calamaspora
 †Calamaspora breviradiata – or unidentified comparable form
  †Calamites
 †Calamospora
 †Calamospora breviradiata
 †Calamospora hartungiana
 †Calamospora liquida
 †Calamospora mutabilis
 †Calamospora pedata
 †Calamospora straminea
 †Calathium
 †Calceocrinus
 †Calceocrinus humilis
 †Callipteris
 †Callistophyton
 †Callistophyton boyssetii
 †Calohymen – type locality for genus
 †Calohymen permianus – type locality for species
 †Calycocrinus
 †Calycocrinus furnishi – type locality for species
 †Calycocrinus symmetricus – type locality for species
  †Calymene
 †Calymene clavicula
 †Calyptaulax
 †Calyptaulax annulata
 †Camarophorella
 †Camarotoechia
 †Camarotoechia altisulcata
 †Camarotoechia carmelensis
 †Camarotoechia filistriata
 †Camarotoechia haraganensis
 †Camarotoechia oklahomensis
 † Camerate
 †Camerella
 †Camerella anteroplicata
 †Camerella oklahomensis
 †Camorphoria
 †Campbelloceras
 †Cancelloceras
 †Cancelloceras huntsvillense – type locality for species
 †Cancrinella
 †Cancrinella boonensis
 †Caneyella
 †Capnophyllum
 †Captorhinikos
 †Captorhinikos chozaensis
 †Captorhinikos parvus – type locality for species
 †Captorhinikos valensis
   †Captorhinus
 †Captorhinus aguti
 †Captorhinus kierani – type locality for species
 †Captorhinus laticeps – type locality for species
 †Captorhinus magnus – type locality for species
 †Carabocrinus
 †Carabocrinus loeblichi
 †Carabocrinus logani
 †Carabocrinus treadwelli
 †Carabocrinus tumidus
 †Carabocrinus vancortlandi – or unidentified comparable form
 †Carbonocoryphe
 †Carbonocoryphe planucauda
 †Carboprimitia
 †Carboprimitia rotunda – or unidentified comparable form
  †Cardiocephalus
 †Cardiocephalus peabodyi – type locality for species
 †Cardiocephalus sternbergi – or unidentified comparable form
 †Cardiodella
 †Cardiodella abbreviatus
 †Cardiodella arcuatus
 †Cardiodella densus
 †Cardiodella robustus
 †Carolinites
 †Carolinites sibiricus
 †Caryocaris – tentative report
 †Caryocrinites
 †Cavellina
 †Cavellina lata
 †Cavellina subovata
 †Cavernula
 †Cavernula coccidia
 †Cavernula pediculata
 †Centrotarphyceras
 †Centrotarphyceras powersi
 †Ceramopora
 †Ceramopora unapensis
 †Ceramoporella
 †Ceramoporella ingenua
 †Ceratiocaris
 †Ceratocephala
 †Ceratocephala graffhami
 †Ceratonurus
 †Ceratopea
 †Ceraurinella
  †Ceraurus
 †Ceraurus ruidus
 †Cerithioides – tentative report
 †Cerithioides gleanensis
 †Chaenocardia
 †Chaenocardia ovata
 †Chaetetes
 †Chaetetes milleporaceus – or unidentified comparable form
 †Chaloneria
 †Champlainopora
 †Champlainopora chazyensis
 †Chapmania 
 †Chapmania carterensis
 †Chapmania oklahomensis
 †Chapmania taylori
 †Chaulistomella
 †Chaulistomella crassa
 †Chaulistomella magna
 †Chaulistomella mira
 †Chaulistomella mundula
 †Chaulistomella nitens
 †Chaulistomella obesa
 †Cheirocrinus
 †Cheirocystis
 †Cheirocystis ardmorensis
  †Cheirurus
 †Cheirurus infensus
 †Cheirurus phollikodes – type locality for species
 †Chilotrypa
 †Chilotrypa distans – type locality for species
 †Chlidochirus
 †Choctawites
 †Choctawites choctawensis
 †Chonetes
 †Chonetes decipiens
 †Chonetes euampygus
 †Chonetes kingi – type locality for species
 †Chonetes mesoloba
 †Chonetinella
 †Chonetinella flemingi – or unidentified comparable form
 †Cibecuia
 †Cibecuia gouldii
 †Cibolocrinus
 †Cibolocrinus bellus – type locality for species
 †Cibolocrinus circulus – type locality for species
 †Cibolocrinus spinosus – type locality for species
 †Cibolocrinus tumidus
 †Cirratriradites
 †Cirratriradites annulatus
 †Cirratriradites annuliformis
 †Cirratriradites maculatus
 †Cirratriradites saturnii
  †Cladochonus
 †Claritacarpus – type locality for genus
 †Claritacarpus smithi – type locality for species
 †Clarkeolepis – type locality for genus
 †Clarkeolepis clarkei – type locality for species
 †Clarkeolepis elegans – type locality for species
 †Clathrocrinus
 †Clathrocrinus grileyi – type locality for species
 †Clavasporites – type locality for genus
 †Clavasporites irregularis – type locality for species
 †Clavatasporites
 †Clavatasporites irregularis
 †Cleiocrinus
 †Cleiocrinus bromidensis – type locality for species
 †Cleiocrinus regius
  †Cleiothyridina
 †Cleiothyridina glenparkensis – or unidentified comparable form
 †Cleiothyridina orbicularis
 †Cleithronetrum
 †Cleithronetrum cancellatum
 †Cleithyridina
 †Cleithyridina orbicularis
 †Clepsydrops
 †Climacammina
 Cliona
 †Cliona fenestralis – type locality for species
 †Cliona paleodendrica – type locality for species
 †Cliona stellata – type locality for species
 †Clionolithes
 †Clionolithes radicans – or unidentified comparable form
 †Coelochilina
 †Coelochilina alata
 †Coelospira
 †Coelospira concava
 †Coelospira saffordi
 †Coelospira virginia
 †Colaptomena
 †Colaptomena bella
 †Coledium
 †Coledium simulans
  †Colobomycter – type locality for genus
 †Colobomycter pholeter – type locality for species
 †Colobomycter vaughni – type locality for species
 †Colpodecrinus
 †Complexisporites
 †Complexisporites polymorphus
  †Composita
 †Composita mexicana
 †Composita rotunda
 †Composita subcircularis
 †Composita subtilita
 †Composita wasatchensis
 Concavisporites
 †Concavissimisporites
 †Condracypris
 †Condracypris binoda
 †Condracypris coalensis – type locality for species
 †Condracypris parallela
 †Condracypris simplex
 †Condranema
 †Condranema magna – or unidentified comparable form
 †Conularia
 †Conularia crustula – or unidentified comparable form
 †Coolinia
 †Coolinia reedsi
 †Cordania
 †Cordania falcata
 †Cordania wessmani
 †Cordylodus
 †Cornigella
 †Cornigella pushmatahensis – type locality for species
  †Cornulites
 †Cornulites inelegans
 Cornuspira
 †Cornuspira semiconstrictus
     †Cotylorhynchus – type locality for genus
 †Cotylorhynchus bransoni – type locality for species
 †Cotylorhynchus romeri – type locality for species
 †Cranaena
 †Cranaena globosa
 †Cranaena salinensis – type locality for species
 Crania
 †Crania minuta – type locality for species
 †Craniops
 †Craniops tenuis
 †Crassispora
 †Crassispora kosankei
 †Cravenoceras
 †Cremacrinus
 †Cricotillus
 †Cricotillus brachydens
    †Cricotus
 †Cricotus crassidiscus
 †Crinerocrinus
 †Crinisarina
 †Crinisarina prouti
 †Crinoedischia
 †Crinoedischia noblensis – type locality for species
 †Cromyocrinus
 †Cromyocrinus grandis
 †Crossotelos – type locality for genus
 †Crossotelos annulatus – type locality for species
 †Crurithyris
 †Crurithyris planoconvexa
 †Cruruthyris
 †Cruruthyris planoconvexa
 †Crustaesporites
 †Crustaesporites globulus – tentative report
 †Cryptophyllus
 †Cryptophyllus gibbosum
 †Cryptophyllus nuculopsis
 †Cryptophyllus simpsoni
 †Cryptothyrella – tentative report
 †Cryptothyrella ovoides
  †Ctenacanthus – report made of unidentified related form or using admittedly obsolete nomenclature
 †Ctenobolbina
 †Ctenobolbina abrupta
 †Ctenobolbina bispinata
 †Ctenobolbina cancellata
 †Ctenobolbina inflata
 †Ctenobolbina parva
 †Ctenobolbina percarinata
 †Ctenobolbina varicata
 †Cullisonia
 †Cullisonia producta
 †Curtognathus
 †Curtognathus cordiformis
 †Curtognathus coronata
 †Curtognathus limitaris
 †Cyathocystis
 †Cyathocystis oklahomae
 †Cybeloides
 †Cybelopsis
 †Cycadopites
 †Cyclites
 †Cyclites depressus – type locality for species
 †Cyclobathmus
 †Cyclobathmus haworthi – type locality for species
 †Cycloceras
 †Cycloceras meeki – type locality for species
 †Cycloceras randolphensis
 †Cyclocystoides
 †Cyclogranisporites
 †Cyclogranisporites aureus
 †Cyclogranisporites leopoldi
 †Cyclogranisporites microgranus
 †Cyclogranisporites minutus
 †Cyclogranisporites obliquus
 †Cyclogranisporites orbicularis
 †Cyclonema
 †Cycloplectoceras
 †Cycloplectoceras miseri
  †Cyclopteris
 †Cyclopuncta – type locality for genus
 †Cyclopuncta girtyi – type locality for species
 †Cyclospira
 †Cyclospira parva
 †Cyclozyga
 †Cyclozyga neotenica – type locality for species
 †Cymatorhiza – type locality for genus
 †Cymatorhiza kittsi – type locality for species
 †Cymatospira
 †Cymatospira montfortianus
   †Cyphaspis
 †Cyphaspis carrolli
 †Cyphoneurodes
 †Cyphoneurodes patriciae – type locality for species
 †Cypricardella – tentative report
 †Cypricardella enigmatica – type locality for species
 †Cyrtina
 †Cyrtina dalmani
 †Cyrtograptus
 †Cyrtorizoceras
 †Cystiphyllum
 †Cystodictya
 †Cystodictya elegans – type locality for species

D

 †Dactylogonia
 †Dactylogonia sculpturata
 †Dactylogonia subaequicostellata
 †Dalejina
 †Dalejina henryhousensis
 †Dalejina subtriangularis
 †Dalmanella
 †Dalmanella edgewoodensis
  †Dalmanites
 †Dalmanites ptyktorhion
 †Dalmanites rutellum
 †Dapsilodus
 †Dapsilodus obliquicostatus
 †Dapsilodus praecipuus
 †Dapsilodus sparsus
 †Decoriconus
 †Decoriconus fragilis
 †Decoroproetus
 †Decoroproetus anaglyptus
 †Decoroproetus corycoeus
 †Dekayella
 †Dekayella praenuntia
 †Delocrinus
 †Delocrinus densus
 †Delocrinus hemisphericus
 †Delocrinus pentanodus – type locality for species
 †Deloia
 †Deloia sulcata
 †Delopsocus
 †Delopsocus elongatus
 †Delopterum
 †Delopterum latum
 †Delopterum minutum
   †Delorhynchus – type locality for genus
 †Delorhynchus cifellii – type locality for species
 †Delorhynchus priscus – type locality for species
 †Delotaxis
 †Delthyris
 †Delthyris kozlowskii
 †Deltoidospora
 †Deltoidospora adnata
 †Deltoidospora grandis
 †Deltoidospora levis
 †Deltoidospora priddyi
 †Deltoidospora sphaerotriangula
 †Deltoidospora subadnatoides
 †Dendrocrinus
 †Dendrocrinus latibranchiatus – or unidentified comparable form
 †Dendrocrinus rusticus
 †Densosporites
 †Densosporites sphaerotriangularis
 †Derbyia
 †Derbyia crassa – or unidentified comparable form
 †Derbyoides – or unidentified related form
 †Desmoinesia
 †Desmoinesia muricatina
 †Desmorthis
 †Diabolocrinus
  †Diacalymene
 †Diacalymene clavicula
    †Diadectes
 †Diadectes zenos
 †Dianulites
 †Dianulites fastigiatus
 †Dianulites petropolitana
 †Diaphoroceras
 †Diaphorodendron
 †Diaphorodendron dicentricum
 †Diaphorodendron scleroticum
 †Diaphragmus
 †Diaphragmus fasciculatus
 †Dibunophyllum
 †Dibunophyllum hansoni – type locality for species
 †Dicamaropsis
 †Dicamaropsis parva
 †Dicellograptus
 †Dicellograptus gurleyi
 †Dicellograptus mensurans
 †Diceromyonia
 †Diceromyonia tersa – or unidentified comparable form
 †Dichentomum
 †Dichentomum tinctum
 †Dichognathus
 †Dichognathus extensa
 †Dichognathus typica
 †Dicoelosia
 †Dicoelosia oklahomenesis – type locality for species
 †Dicoelosia oklahomensis
 †Dicoelosia varica
 †Dicranella
 †Dicranella fragilis
 †Dicranella macrocarinata
   †Dicranurus
 †Dicranurus elegantus
 †Dicranurus hamatus
 †Dicromyocrinus
 †Dicromyocrinus medius – type locality for species
 †Dicromyocrinus optimus
 †Dicromyocrinus subaplatus – type locality for species
 †Dictybolos – type locality for genus
 †Dictybolos tener – type locality for species
 †Dictyoclostus
 †Dictyoclostus ingrata – or unidentified related form
 †Dictyoclostus mesialis
 †Dictyonema
 †Dictyonema francesiae
 †Dictyonema rockcrossingensis
 †Dictyospongia
 †Dielasma
 †Dielasma oklahomensis – type locality for species
 †Dierespongia – type locality for genus
 †Dierespongia palla – type locality for species
 †Dimeropygiella
    †Dimetrodon
 †Dimetrodon dollovianus
 †Dimetrodon limbatus – or unidentified comparable form
 †Dimetrodon loomisi
 †Dimetrodon macrospondylus
 †Diphuicrinus
 †Diphuicrinus croneisi
 †Diphuicrinus dovelyensis
 †Diphuicrinus faustus – type locality for species
 †Diphuicrinus mammifer – type locality for species
 †Diphuicrinus pentanodus – type locality for species
  †Diplocaulus – type locality for genus
 †Diplocaulus magnicornis
 †Diplocaulus parvus – type locality for species
 †Diplocaulus primus – type locality for species
  †Diplograptus
 †Diplograptus maxwelli
 †Diplothmema
 †Diplothmema pachyderma
 †Diplotrypa
 †Diplotrypa bassleri
 †Discitoceras
 †Disparifusa
 †Disparifusa hystricosa
 †Distacodus
 †Distacodus oklahomensis – type locality for species
 †Ditaxineura
 †Ditaxineura cellulosa
 †Ditoecholasma
 †Ditomopyge
 †Ditomopyge parvulus – or unidentified comparable form
 †Dizygopleura
 †Doleotheca
 †Doleroides
 †Doleroides compressus
 †Doleroides oklahomensis
 †Doleroides vescus
 †Dolerophyllum – tentative report
 †Dolerorthis
 †Dolerorthis hami
 †Dolerorthis nanella
 †Dolerorthis savagei
 †Doleserpeton – type locality for genus
 †Doleserpeton annectens – type locality for species
 †Dolichoharpes
 †Dolichoharpes reticulata
 †Doliocrinus
 †Domatoceras
 †Domatoceras collinsvillense – type locality for species
 †Domatoceras williamsi
 †Donaldina
 †Donaldina attenuata
 †Donaldina grantonensis
 †Donezella
 †Donovaniconus
 †Donovaniconus oklahomensis – type locality for species
 †Drepanoistodus
 †Drepanoistodus suberectus
 †Dudleyaspis
 †Dunbarites
 †Dunbarites rectilateralis
 †Dunbarites wewokensis – type locality for species
 †Duncanella

E

 †Earlandinita
 †Eatonia
 †Eatonia exserta
 †Ecculiomphalus – tentative report
 †Echinaria
 †Echinoconchus
 †Echinoconchus elegans
 †Echinocrinus
 †Echinocrinus cratis – or unidentified related form
 †Echinoencrinites – tentative report
 †Echinoencrinites ornatus
 †Echinoprimitia
 †Echinoprimitia imputata
  †Echinosphaerites
 †Echinosphaerites aurantium
 †Economolopsis
 †Economolopsis anodontoides
 †Ectenaspis
 †Ectenaspis burkhalteri – type locality for species
 †Ectenocrinus
 †Ectenoglossa – tentative report
 †Ectenoglossa sculpta
   †Ectosteorhachis
 †Ectosteorhachis nitidus – or unidentified comparable form
     †Edaphosaurus
 †Edaphosaurus cruciger
   †Edestus – type locality for genus
 †Edestus vorax – type locality for species
 †Edmondia
 †Edmondia rotunda – type locality for species
 †Edmondia senilis – or unidentified comparable form
 †Edmondia splendens – type locality for species
 †Edriocrinus
 †Edriophus
 †Ehlersia
 †Elibatocrinus
 †Elibatocrinus elongatus – or unidentified comparable form
 †Elmoa
 †Elmoa trisecta
 †Elpidocrinus
 †Elpidocrinus tuberosus
 †Embolaster – type locality for genus
 †Embolaster graffhami – type locality for species
 †Emilites
 †Emilites bennisoni – type locality for species
 †Enchostoma – tentative report
 †Enchostoma bicarinatum – or unidentified comparable form
 †Endelocrinus
 †Endelocrinus matheri
 †Endosporites
 †Endosporites globiformis
 †Endosporites plicatus
 †Endosporites zonalis
 †Endothyra
 †Endothyra bowmani
 †Endothyranella
 †Enteletes
 †Entelophyllum
 †Enterolasma
 †Eoasianites
 †Eochiton
 †Eochiton arbucklensis – type locality for species
 †Eochonetes
 †Eochonetes magna
 †Eodictyonella (formerly Dictyonella)
 †Eodictyonella gibbosa
 †Eohippioceras
 †Eohippioceras ferratum
 †Eohollina
 †Eohollina depressa
 †Eohollina papillata
 †Eoleperditia
 †Eoleperditia fabulites
 †Eoleperditia inflativentralis
 †Eolissochonetes
 †Eomartiniopsis
 †Eomartiniopsis rostrata
 †Eomonorachus
 †Eomonorachus divaricatus
 †Eopinnacrinus
 †Eopleurophorus – type locality for genus
 †Eopleurophorus immaturus
 †Eopleurophorus spinulosa – or unidentified comparable form
 †Eoprimitia
 †Eoprimitia bailyana
 †Eoprimitia cooperi
 †Eoprimitia quadrata
 †Eoprimitia subnodosa
 †Eorobergia
 †Eorobergia marginalis – or unidentified comparable form
 †Eoschistoceras
 †Eoschistoceras strawnense
 †Eospirifer
 †Eospirifer acutolineatus
 †Eotomaria
 †Ephedripites
 †Ephedripites corrugatus – type locality for species
 †Epiphyton
 †Equisetites
 †Equisetosporites
 †Eridoconcha
 †Eridoconcha magna
 †Eridoconcha simpsoni
 †Eridopora
 †Eridopora radiata
 †Eridopora stellata
 †Eridotrypa
 †Eridotrypa abrupta
 †Erismodus – tentative report
 †Erisocrinus
 †Erisocrinus wapanucka
    †Eryops
 †Eryops megacephalus
 †Escharopora
 †Escharopora recta
 †Estheria
 †Ethelocrinus – tentative report
 †Ethelocrinus kirki
   †Eucalyptocrinites
 †Eucalyptocrinites pernodosus
 †Euchondria
 †Euchondria subquadrata – type locality for species
 †Eucraterellina
 †Eucraterellina oblonga
 †Eucraterellina randolphi
 †Eucraterellina spitznasi
 †Eucystis
 †Eudissoceras – type locality for genus
 †Eudissoceras collinsvillense – type locality for species
 †Eukloedenella
 †Eumartynovia – type locality for genus
 †Eumartynovia raaschi – type locality for species
 †Eumetria
 †Eumetria deltoides – type locality for species
 †Eumetria matheri – type locality for species
 †Eumetria vera
 †Eumetria verneuiliana
 †Eumorphoceras
 †Eumorphoceras bisulcatum
 †Eumorphoceras girtyi
 †Eumorphocystis
 †Eumorphocystis multiporata
 †Euonychocrinus
 †Eupachycrinus
 †Eupachycrinus magister – or unidentified comparable form
 †Eupachycrinus verrucosus
 †Euphemites
 †Euphemites carbonarius
 †Euphemites compressus – type locality for species
 †Eurychilina
 †Eurychilina papillata
 †Eurychilina subradiata
 †Eurychilina ventrosa
 †Eurygonum
 †Eurygonum nodosum
 †Euryodus
 †Euryodus dalyae – type locality for species
 †Euryodus primus – or unidentified comparable form
 †Eusphenopteris
 †Eusphenopteris scribanii-striata – informal
 †Euspirocrinus
 †Euspirocrinus cirratus
 †Exocrinus
 †Exoriocrinus

F

 †Failleana
 †Failleana limbata – or unidentified comparable form
 †Falcisporites
 †Falcisporites zapfei
 †Fardenia
 †Fardenia attenuata
 †Fardenia reedsi
 †Fascichnus
 †Fascichnus dactylus
 †Fascichnus frutex
 †Fascifera
 †Fascifera dalmanelloidea
 †Fastigatisporites
 †Fastigatisporites physema – type locality for species
  †Favosites
  †Fayella – type locality for genus
 †Fayella chickashaensis – type locality for species
  †Feeserpeton – type locality for genus
 †Feeserpeton oklahomensis – type locality for species
  †Fenestella
 †Fenestella ardmorensis
 †Fenestella bendensis – type locality for species
 †Fenestella cestriensis
 †Fenestella chesterensis – or unidentified comparable form
 †Fenestella cumingsi
 †Fenestella exigua
 †Fenestella frutex – or unidentified comparable form
 †Fenestella granularis – type locality for species
 †Fenestella kosomensis – type locality for species
 †Fenestella morrowensis
 †Fenestella oklahomensis – type locality for species
 †Fenestella ovatipora – type locality for species
 †Fenestella paradisensis
 †Fenestella rara – type locality for species
 †Fenestella serratula
 †Fenesteverta – type locality for genus
 †Fenesteverta nicklesi – type locality for species
 †Fernglenia
 †Fernglenia vernonensis
 †Finkelnburgia
 †Finkelnburgia crassicostata
 †Fistulipora
 †Flexifenestella
 †Flexifenestella grandis – type locality for species
 †Florinites
 †Florinites mediapudens
 †Florinites millotti
 †Florinites similis
 †Florinites visendus
 †Florinites volans
 †Foerstediscus
 †Foerstia
 †Foerstia ohioensis
 †Fragiscutellum
 †Fragiscutellum glebalis
 †Fragiscutum
  †Frencrinuroides
 †Frencrinuroides capitonis
  †Fusulina

G

 †Galateacrinus
 †Gardenasporites
 †Gardenasporites heisselii
 †Garwoodia
 †Gastrioceras
 †Gastrioceras adaense
 †Gastrioceras fittsi
 †Gastrioceras prone – type locality for species
 †Gastrioceras retiferum – type locality for species
 †Gazacrinus
 †Gazacrinus stellatus
 †Gelasinocephalus
 †Gelasinocephalus pustulosus
 †Gelasinocephalus whittingtoni
 †Geniculifera
 †Geniculifera siphuncula – type locality for species
 †Gigagramma – type locality for genus
 †Gigagramma carpenteri – type locality for species
 †Gigantopteris
 †Gigantopteris americana
 †Girtycoelia
 †Girtyella
 †Girtyspira
 †Girtyspira alvaensis – type locality for species
 †Girvanella
 †Gissocrinus
 †Gissocrinus quadratus
 †Glabovalvulina – tentative report
 †Glabrocingulum
 †Glabrocingulum grayvillense
 †Glabrocingulum stellaeformis
 †Glabrocingulum wannense – type locality for species
 †Glaphurochiton
 †Glaphyrites
 †Glaphyrites angulatus
 †Glaphyrites excelsus – type locality for species
 †Glaphyrites hyattianus
 †Glaphyrites subdiscus
 †Glaphyrites warei – type locality for species
 †Glaphyrophlebia
 †Glaphyrophlebia anderhalterorum – type locality for species
 †Glaukosocrinus
 †Globivalvulina
 †Globovalvulina
 †Globulocystites
 †Globulocystites cristatus
 †Globulocystites infundus
 †Glosella
 †Glosella liumbona
 †Gloverilima
 †Gloverilima pratti
 †Glymmatobolbina
 †Glymmatobolbina quadrata
 †Glyprorthis
 †Glyprorthis costellata
 †Glyptocystella
 †Glyptocystella loeblichae
 †Glyptocystites
 †Glyptocystites forbesi
 †Glyptocystites loeblichae
 †Glyptocystites logani
 †Glyptocystites multiporus
 †Glyptocystites regnelli – or unidentified comparable form
 †Glyptopleura
 †Glyptopleura geisi – type locality for species
 †Glyptopleura scotti – type locality for species
 †Glyptopleura warthini – type locality for species
 †Glyptorthis
 †Glyptorthis crenulata – type locality for species
 †Glyptorthis glaseri
 †Glyptorthis obesa – type locality for species
 †Glyptorthis uncinata – type locality for species
  †Gnathodus
  †Gnathorhiza
 †Gnathorhiza serrata
 †Gnetalesaccus
 †Gnetalesaccus variabilis
 †Gnorimocrinus
 †Gnorimocrinus pontotocensis
 †Goniasma
  †Goniatites
 †Goniatites multiliratus – type locality for species
 †Gonioglyphioceras
 †Gonioglyphioceras gracile
 †Gonioloboceratoides
 †Goniophora
 †Gorgonisphaeridium
 †Gorgonisphaeridium antiquum
 †Gotlandochiton
 †Gotlandochiton hami – type locality for species
 †Graffhamicrinus
 †Graffhamicrinus antiquus
 †Grammolomatella
 †Granasporites
 †Granasporites medius
 †Grandfieldia – type locality for genus
 †Grandfieldia callilepidota – type locality for species
 †Granulatisporites
 †Granulatisporites granularis
 †Granulatisporites granulatus
 †Granulatisporites microgranifer
 †Granulatisporites minutus
 †Granulatisporites verrucosus
 †Graptodictya
 †Graptodictya elegantula
 †Griffithidella
 †Griffithidella alternata
 †Griffithidella doris
 †Gryphellina
 †Gryphellina sellardsi – type locality for species
 †Grypocrinus
 †Gyalorhethium
 †Gyalorhethium chondrodes
  †Gymnophyllum
 †Gymnophyllum wardi
 †Gypidula
 †Gypidula multicostata
 †Gyronema

H

 †Hagnocrinus
 †Halliella
 †Halliella labiosa
   †Hallopora
 †Hallopora dubia
 †Hallopora macrostoma
 †Hallopora multitabulata
 †Hallopora pachymura
   †Halysites
 †Hamiapollenites – type locality for genus
 †Hamiapollenites karrooensis
 †Hamiapollenites saccatus – type locality for species
 †Hamiapollenites tractiferinus
 †Haplistion
 †Haplistion apletum – type locality for species
 †Hapsidopareion – type locality for genus
 †Hapsidopareion lepton – type locality for species
 †Harpidella
 †Harpidella butorus
 †Harpillaenus
 †Healdia
 †Healdia caneyensis
 †Healdia compressa
 †Healdia harltoni – type locality for species
 †Healdia simplicissima – type locality for species
 †Hebetorthoceras
 †Hebetorthoceras brokenarrowense
 †Heliolites
 †Heliosocrinus
 †Heliosocrinus neotosus – type locality for species
 †Helminthochiton
 †Helminthochiton riddlei
 †Hemiliroceras
 †Hemiliroceras reticulatum – type locality for species
 †Hemiphragma
 †Hemiphragma irrasum
 †Hemiphragma pulchra
 †Hesperocystis
 †Hesperocystis deckeri
 †Hesperorthis
 †Hesperorthis crinerensis
 †Hesperorthis rowlandi
 †Hesperorthis sulcata
 †Heterangium
 †Heteropecten
 †Heteropecten vanvleeti – type locality for species
 †Heterotrypa
 †Heterotrypa taffi
 †Hexacrinites
 †Hexacrinites adaensis
 †Hexacrinites carinatus
 †Hibbertia
 †Hindia
 †Hindiodella
 †Hippocrepina
 †Hippocrepina bendensis
 †Hiscobeccus
 †Hiscobeccus capax
 †Hoffmeisterites – type locality for genus
 †Hoffmeisterites microdens – type locality for species
 †Holcospermum
 †Hollinella
 †Hollinella burlingamensis
 †Hollinella radiata
 †Holmesella
 †Holmesella triangularis – type locality for species
 †Holmesella wapanuckensis – type locality for species
  †Holopea – tentative report
 †Homocladus
 †Homocladus grandis
 †Homoeospira
 †Homoeospira costatula
 †Homoeospira foerstei
 †Homoeospira subgibbosa
 †Homotrypa
 †Homotrypa callitoecha
 †Homotrypa dickeyvillensis
 †Homotrypa multitabulata
 †Homotrypa sagittata
 †Homotrypa tuberculata
 †Homotrypa ulrichi
 †Hormotoma
 †Howellella
 †Howellella cycloptera
 †Howellella henryhousensis
 †Howellella splendens
 †Hudsonaster
 †Huntonella – type locality for genus
 †Huntonella unicornis – type locality for species
  †Huntoniatonia
 †Huntoniatonia huntonensis
 †Huntoniatonia lingulifer
 †Huntoniatonia oklahomae
 †Huntoniatonia purduei
 †Hustedia
 †Hustedia mormoni – or unidentified comparable form
 †Hybocrinus
 †Hybocrinus conicus
 †Hybocrinus crinerensis
 †Hybocrinus nitidus
 †Hybocrinus pyxidatus
 †Hydreionocrinus
 †Hydreionocrinus patulus
 Hyperammina
 †Hyperammina elongata
 †Hyperammina johnsvalleyensis – type locality for species
 †Hyperammina rugosa
 †Hyperamminoides
 †Hyperamminoides glabra
 †Hyperchilarina
 †Hyperchilarina nodosimarginata
 †Hypergonia
 †Hypergonia quadricarinata – or unidentified comparable form
 †Hypergonia tatei – or unidentified related form

I

 †Ianthinopsis
 †Icthyocrinus
 †Icthyocrinus corbis
 †Idiognathodus
 †Idiognathodus delicates
 †Idiognathodus sinuatus
  †Illaenus
 †Illaenus utahensis – or unidentified comparable form
 †Illenites
 †Illenites delasaucei
 †Illenites parvus
 †Inflatia
 †Inflatia cherokeensis
 †Inflatia clydensis
 †Inflatia cooperi
 †Inflatia gracilis
 †Inflatia inflata
 †Inflatia pusilla
 †Inflatia succincta – type locality for species
 †Ischyrotoma
 †Ischyrotoma sila
 †Isoallagecrinus
 †Isoallagecrinus barnettensis – type locality for species
 †Isochilina
 †Isochilina bulbosa
 †Isorthis
 †Isorthis arcuaria
 †Isorthis pygmaea
 †Isoteloides
 †Isoteloides peri
  †Isotelus
 †Isotelus bradleyi – type locality for species
 †Isotelus violaensis – type locality for species
 †Ivanovia – tentative report
 †Ivoechiton
 †Ivoechiton calathicolus – type locality for species
 †Ivoechiton oklahomensis – type locality for species

J

 †Janusella
 †Janusella biceratina
 †Jeffersonia
 †Jeffersonia granosa
 †Jeffersonia jenni
 †Jeffersonia ulrichi
 †Jonesina
 †Jonesina spinigera – or unidentified comparable form
 †Jonesites
 †Jonesites circa
 †Jonesites huntonensis – type locality for species
 †Juresania

K

  †Kainops
 †Kainops invius
 †Kainops raymondi
 †Kallimorphocrinus
 †Kallimorphocrinus eaglei – type locality for species
 †Kawina
 †Kayina
 †Kayina hybosa
 †Kayina porosa
 †Kennedya
 †Kennedya fraseri – type locality for species
 †Kennedya mirabilis
 †Keokukia
 †Keokukia sulcata
 †Kettneraspis
 †Kettneraspis williamsi
 †Kirkbya
 †Kirkbya bendensis – type locality for species
 †Kirkbya moorei
 †Kirkbya symmetrica
 †Kirkbyella
 †Kirkbyella obliqua
 †Kirkidium
 †Kirkocystis – type locality for genus
 †Kirkocystis papillata – type locality for species
 †Kitakamithyris
 †Kitakamithyris cooperensis
 †Klausipollenites
 †Klausipollenites aequus
 †Klausipollenites schaubergeri
 †Knightites
 †Knightites montfortianum
 †Knightoceras
 †Knightoceras patulum
 †Kockelella
 †Kockelella amsdeni
 †Kockelella crassa
 †Kockelella ortus
 †Kockelella patula
 †Kockelella ranuliformis
 †Kockelella stauros
 †Kockelella variabilis
 †Kockelella walliseri
 †Kosovopeltis
 †Kozlowskia
 †Kozlowskia splendens
 †Kozlowskiellina
 †Kozlowskiellina vaningeni
 †Krausella
 †Krausella arcuata
 †Krotovia
 †Kukalova – type locality for genus
 †Kukalova americana – type locality for species

L

  †Labidosaurikos – type locality for genus
 †Labidosaurikos meachami – type locality for species
   †Labidosaurus
 †Labiisporites
 †Labiisporites granulatus
 †Laeviatosporites
 †Laeviatosporites ovalis
 Laevidentalium
 †Laevidentalium venustum – or unidentified comparable form
 †Laevigatosporites
 †Laevigatosporites desmoinesensis
 †Laevigatosporites globosus
 †Laevigatosporites medius
 †Laevigatosporites ovalis
 †Laevigatosporites striatus
 †Laevigatosporites vulgaris
 †Lamellosathyris
 †Lamellosathyris lamellosa
 †Lampterocrinus
 †Lampterocrinus fatigatus
 †Lasanocrinus
 †Lasanocrinus daileyi
 †Lasanocrinus minutus – type locality for species
 †Lasanocrinus multinodulus – type locality for species
 †Lasanocrinus nodatus – type locality for species
 †Lasanocrinus nodus – type locality for species
 †Lasanocrinus strigosus
 †Latosporites
 †Latosporites minutus
 †Leangella
 †Leangella dissiticostella
 †Lecanocrinus
 †Lecanocrinus erectus
 †Lecythiocrinus
 †Lecythiocrinus asymmetricus – type locality for species
 †Leioclema
 †Leioclema dozierense
 †Leioclema pushmatahensis – type locality for species
 †Leiovalia
 †Leiovalia scaberula
 †Leiovalia teretis
 †Lemmatophora
 †Lemmatophora typa
  †Leonaspis
 †Leonaspis williamsi
 †Lepadocystites
 †Lepadocystites moorei – tentative report
 †Leperditella
 †Leperditella aequilatera
 †Leperditella altiforma
 †Leperditella deckeri
 †Leperditella incisa
 †Leperditella jonesinoides
 †Leperditella minima
 †Leperditella porosa
 †Leperditella rex
 †Leperditella tumida
 †Leperditia
 †Lepidocoelus
 †Lepidocyclus
 †Lepidocyclus cooperi
 †Lepidocyclus manniensis – tentative report
 †Lepidocyclus oblongus
 †Lepidocyclus perlamellosus
    †Lepidodendron
 †Lepidodendron hickii
 †Lepidophloios
 †Lepidophloios hallii/johnsonii
 †Leptaena
 †Leptaena acuticuspidata – type locality for species
 †Leptaena oklahomensis – type locality for species
 †Leptaenisca
 †Leptaenisca concava
 †Leptaenisca irregularis
 †Leptagonia
 †Leptagonia analoga
 †Leptochirognathus
 †Leptochirognathus extensa
 †Leptodesma
 †Leptodesma gouldii – type locality for species
 †Leptodesma matheri – type locality for species
 †Leptodesma stenzeli – type locality for species
 †Leptoskelidion – tentative report
 †Leptoskelidion septulosum
 †Leptostrophia
 †Leptostrophia beckii
 †Levenea
 †Levenea subcarinata
 †Ligogramma – type locality for genus
 †Ligogramma sinuosa – type locality for species
 †Ligogramma wichita – type locality for species
 †Limipecten
 †Limipecten newelli – type locality for species
 †Lindosroemella
 †Lindosroemella patula – or unidentified comparable form
 †Lindostoemella
 †Lindostoemella patula – or unidentified comparable form
 †Lindostroemella
 †Lindostroemella patula – or unidentified comparable form
 Lingula
 †Lingula carbonaria – or unidentified comparable form
 †Lingula eva
 †Lingula paracletus – or unidentified comparable form
 †Lingulasma
 †Lingulasma oklahomense
  †Lingulella
 †Lingulella galba
 †Lingulella glypta
 †Linoproductus
 †Linoproductus delawarii – type locality for species
 †Linoproductus ovatus
 †Linoproductus prattenianus
 †Liomolgocrinus
 †Liomopterella
 †Liomopterella pediaecetae – type locality for species
 †Liomopterum
 †Liomopterum ornatum
 †Liospira
 †Liroceras
 †Liroceras liratum
 †Lisca
 †Lisca minuta
 †Lissatrypa
 †Lissatrypa clairensis
 †Lissatrypa concentrica
 †Lissatrypa decaturensis
 †Lissatrypa henryhousensis
 †Lissatrypa parvula
 †Lissostrophia
 †Lissostrophia cooperi
 †Lissostrophia lindenensis
 †Lissostrophia lindensis
  Lithophaga
 Lituotuba
  †Llistrofus – type locality for genus
 †Llistrofus pricei – type locality for species
   †Lonchodomas
 †Lonchodomas mcgeheei
 †Lonchodus
 †Lophamplexus
 †Lophamplexus brevifolius – type locality for species
 †Lophamplexus lutarius – type locality for species
 †Lophamplexus spanius – type locality for species
 †Lophamplexus vagus – type locality for species
 †Lophophyllidium
 †Lophophyllidium asarcum – type locality for species
 †Lophophyllidium compressum – type locality for species
 †Lophophyllidium hadrum
 †Lophophyllidium profundum
 †Lophophyllidium wewokanum – type locality for species
 †Lophophyllum
 †Lophospira
 †Lophotichium
 †Lophotichium amoenum
 †Lophotriletes
 †Lophotriletes commissuralis
 †Lophotriletes ibrahimii
 †Lophotriletes microsaetosus
 †Lophotriletes pseudaculeatus
 †Lophotriletes rarispinosus
 †Lophpophyllum
 †Lophpophyllum profundum – or unidentified comparable form
 †Loxoedischia – type locality for genus
 †Loxoedischia drewi – type locality for species
 †Lueckisporites
 †Lueckisporites fimbriatus
 †Lueckisporites virkkiae
 †Lunaferamita
 †Lunaferamita bassleri
 †Lunaferamita virginiensis
 †Lundbladispora
 †Lunulasporites – type locality for genus
 †Lunulasporites vulgaris – type locality for species
 †Lutesvillia
 †Lutesvillia bispinosa
 †Lycospora
 †Lycospora granulata
 †Lycospora micropapillata
 †Lycospora pellucida
 †Lycospora pusilla
 †Lycospora rotuda
 †Lycospora rotunda
 †Lyroschizodus
 †Lyroschizodus oklahomensis – type locality for species
   †Lysorophus
 †Lysorophus tricarinatus

M

 †Maclurites
    †Macroleter
 †Macroleter agilis – type locality for species
 †Macropotamorhynchus
 †Macropotamorhynchus tuta
 †Macrostylocrinus
 †Macrostylocrinus striatus
 †Mandalocystis – type locality for genus
 †Mandalocystis dockeryi – type locality for species
 †Manespira
 †Manespira costata
 †Manespira elongata
 †Manespira magnicostata
 †Marginatia
 †Marginatia magna
 †Marginifera
 †Marginovatia
 †Marginovatia manardensis
 †Marginovatia minor
 †Marginovatia pumila
 †Mariopteris
 †Mariopteris nervosa
 †Mariopteris occidentalis
 †Marsupiocrinus
 †Marsupiocrinus stellatus
 †Marsupipollenites
 †Marsupipollenites striatus
 †Martynovia
 †Martynovia halli – type locality for species
 †Martynovia longipennis – type locality for species
 †Mastigograptus
 †Matonisporites
 †Maurotarion
 †Maurotarion axitiosum
 †Maximites
 †Maximites oklahomensis – type locality for species
 †Mcqueenoceras
 †Meekella
 †Meekella striatocostata
 †Meekopinna
 †Meekopora
 †Meekospira
 †Meekospira choctawensis
 †Meekospira peracuta
 †Megactenopetalus
 †Megactenopetalus kaibabanus
 †Megaglossoceras
 †Megakozlowskiella
 †Megakozlowskiella velata
 †Megaliocrinus
 †Megaliocrinus aplatus
 †Megamyonia
 †Megamyonia mankini
 †Meganeuropsis
 †Meganeuropsis americana – type locality for species
 †Merista
 †Merista oklahomensis
  †Meristella
 †Meristella atoka
 †Meristina
 †Meristina claritensis
 †Meristina roemeri
 †Mescalites
 †Mescalites discoidalis
 †Mesolobus
 †Mesotrypa
 †Mesotrypa angularis
 †Mesotrypa favosa
 †Mesotrypa tubulifera
 †Mesoxylon
 †Metachorus
 †Metachorus striolatus – type locality for species
  †Metacoceras
 †Metacoceras cornutum
 †Metacoceras sinuosum
 †Metacoceras vagans – type locality for species
 †Metaconularia
 †Metacromyocrinus
 †Metacromyocrinus fundundus – type locality for species
 †Metacromyocrinus papulosus
 †Metutharocrinus
 †Metutharocrinus cockei
 †Metutharocrinus spinifer – type locality for species
 †Metutharocrinus undulatus – type locality for species
 †Michelinia
 †Michelinia meekana
 †Michelinoceras
 †Michelinoceras directum
 †Michelinoceras wapanuckense
  †Micraroter – type locality for genus
 †Micraroter erythrogeios – type locality for species
 †Microcaracrinus
 †Microcaracrinus delicatus
 †Microcoelodus
 †Microcoelodus asymmetricus
 †Microcoelodus inornatus
 †Microcoelodus intermedius
 †Microcoelodus minutidentatus
 †Microcoelodus typus
 †Microleter – type locality for genus
 †Microleter mckinzieorum – type locality for species
 †Microreticulatisporites
 †Microreticulatisporites nobilis
 †Microreticulatisporites sulcatus
 †Microschmidtella
 †Microschmidtella berdanae – type locality for species
 †Microschmidtella hami – type locality for species
 †Microspermopteris
 †Microspermopteris aphyllum
 †Micula – tentative report
 †Midcopterum – type locality for genus
 †Midcopterum evidens – type locality for species
 †Mimella
 †Mimella extensa
 †Mimella subquadrata
 †Misthodotes
 †Misthodotes edmundsi – type locality for species
 †Misthodotes ovalis
 †Mitorthoceras
 †Mitorthoceras crebriliratum – type locality for species
 †Mitorthoceras perfilosum
 †Modiolopsis – tentative report
 Modiolus
 †Monoceratella
 †Monoceratella brevispinata
 †Monoceratina
 †Monoceratina ardmorensis
 †Monoceratina ventralis
  †Monograptus
 †Monticuliporella
 †Monticuliporella croneisi
 †Monticuliporella peculiaris
 †Monticuliporella shideleri
 †Mooreina
 †Mooreina johnsvalleyensis – type locality for species
 †Mooreisporites
 †Mooreisporites inusitatus
 †Mooreoceras
 †Moorites
 †Moravia
 †Moravia grandis – type locality for species
 †Moundocrinus
 †Moundocrinus coalensis – type locality for species
 †Mucrosaccus
 †Mucrosaccus alatus – type locality for species
 †Multicostella
 †Multicostella convexa
 †Multicostella sulcata
 †Multidentodus – type locality for genus
 †Multidentodus brevis – type locality for species
 †Multidentodus gracilis – type locality for species
 †Multidentodus irregularis – type locality for species
 †Multidentodus johnsvalleyensis – type locality for species
 †Multidentodus typicus – type locality for species
 †Multidentodus wapanuckensis – type locality for species
 †Murinella
 †Murinella partita
 †Murospora
 †Murospora kosankei
 †Myalina
 †Myalina lepta
   †Mycterosaurus – type locality for genus
 †Mycterosaurus longiceps – type locality for species
 †Myeinocystites
 †Myeinocystites natus
 †Myelodactylus

N

 †Nanicrinus
 †Nanicrinus papillatus
 †Nannaroter – type locality for genus
 †Nannaroter mckinziei – type locality for species
 †Nannospondylus – type locality for genus
 †Nannospondylus stewarti – type locality for species
 †Naticonema
  †Naticopsis
 †Naticopsis transversa – type locality for species
 †Navispira
 †Navispira saffordi
 †Neoarchaeocrinus
 †Neoarchaeocrinus necopinus
 †Neochonetes
 †Neochonetes granulifer
 †Neodimorphoceras
 †Neodimorphoceras oklahomae
 †Neoglyphioceras
 †Neoglyphioceras caneyanum – type locality for species
 †Neoisorophusella
 †Neoisorophusella whitesidei – type locality for species
 †Neokoninckophyllum
 †Neokoninckophyllum acolumnatum
 †Neokoninckophyllum tushanense
 †Neoraistrickia
  †Neospirifer
 †Neospirifer dunbari
 †Neostrophia
 †Neostrophia gregaria
 †Neothlipsura
 †Neothlipsura furca
   †Neuropteris
 †Neuropteris heterophylla
 †Neuropteris macrophylla
 †Neuropteris obliqua
 †Neuropteris osmundae
 †Neuropteris rarinervis
 †Nicholsonella
 †Nicholsonella acanthobscura
 †Nicholsonella irregularis
 †Nicholsonella laminata
 †Nicholsonella moniliformis
 †Nobloedischia – type locality for genus
 †Nobloedischia rasnitsyni – type locality for species
 †Nodosinella
 †Nodosinella glennensis – type locality for species
 †Nucleospira
 †Nucleospira concentrica
 †Nucleospira ventricosa
   Nucula
 Nuculana
 †Nuculavus
 †Nuculopsis
 †Nuculopsis girtyi
 †Nuculopsis subventricosa
 †Nuculopsis wewoka
 †Nuculopsis wewokana
 †Nudauris
 †Nudauris reticulata
 †Nuferella
 †Nuferella rothi – type locality for species
 †Nummicrinus
 †Nummicrinus brevis
 †Nummicrinus papilloseous
 †Nummulostegina
 †Nummulostegina ardmorensis – type locality for species
 †Nuskoisporites
 †Nuskoisporites renulatus – type locality for species

O

 †Obturamentella – type locality for genus
 †Obturamentella wadei
 †Octonaria
   †Odontochile
 †Odontochile syncrama
 †Odontochile taffi
 †Odontopteris
 †Odontopteris permiensis – or unidentified comparable form
 †Oepikina
 †Oepikina expatiata
 †Oepikina extensa
 †Oepikina formosa
 †Oepikina gregaria
 †Oinochoe
 †Oinochoe coccymelum – type locality for species
 †Oistodus
 †Oistodus abundans
 †Oistodus inclinatus
 †Oklahomacrinus
 †Oklahomacrinus frostae
 †Oklahomacystis
 †Oklahomacystis spissus
 †Oklahomacystis tribrachiatus
 †Oklahomasporites – type locality for genus
 †Oklahomasporites majori – type locality for species
 †Oligophyllum – or unidentified comparable form
 †Oligotypus
 †Oligotypus tillyardi
 † Oliveria
 †Oltulocrinus
 †Omphalotrochus
 †Omphalotrochus wolfcampensis
 †Onniella – tentative report
 †Onychoplecia
 †Onychoplecia tenuis
 †Onychotreta
 †Onychotreta multiplicata
     †Ophiacodon
 †Ophiacodon major
 †Ophiacodon mirus – or unidentified comparable form
 †Ophiacodon uniformis
 †Ophiletina
 †Ophiletina bromidensis – type locality for species
 †Opisthodontosaurus – type locality for genus
 †Opisthodontosaurus carrolli – type locality for species
 †Orbiculoidea
 †Orbiculoidea eximia
 †Orbignyella
 †Orbignyella sublamellosa
 †Orobias
 †Orobias ciscoensis
 †Oromycter – type locality for genus
 †Oromycter dolesorum – type locality for species
 †Orovenator – type locality for genus
 †Orovenator mayorum – type locality for species
    †Orthacanthus
 †Orthacanthus compressus
  †Orthoceras
 †Orthograptus
 †Orthograptus eucharis
 †Orthonema
 †Orthosphaeridium
 †Orthosphaeridium vibrissiferum
 †Orthostrophella
 †Orthostrophella clairensis
 †Orthostrophia
 †Orthostrophia brownsportensis – or unidentified comparable form
 †Orthostrophia strophomenoides
 †Orthotetes
 †Orthotetes kaskaskiensis
 †Orthotetes springerensis – type locality for species
 †Otarion
 †Otarion axitosum – type locality for species
 †Ottonosia
 †Oulodus
 †Oulodus siluricus
 †Ovatia
 †Ovatia laevicosta
 †Oxoplecia
 †Oxoplecia filosa
 †Oxoplecia gouldi
 †Oxyprora
 †Oxyprora oklahomaense
 †Oxyprora sayrei – type locality for species
 †Ozarkodina
 †Ozarkodina bohemica
 †Ozarkodina confluens
 †Ozarkodina crassa
 †Ozarkodina sagitta

P

 †Pachydictya
 †Pachydictya bromidensis
 †Pachydictya sheldonensis
 †Pachydomella
 †Pachydomella sohni – type locality for species
 †Pachyglossella
 †Pachyglossella biconvexa
 †Pachylyroceras
 †Pachylyroceras cloudi
  †Paciphacops
 †Paciphacops birdsongensis – or unidentified comparable form
 †Paciphacops campbelli
 †Paciphacops raymondi
 †Paladin
 †Paladin morrowensis
 †Paladin mucronatus – tentative report
 Palaeoaplysina – tentative report
 †Palaeocapulus – tentative report
 †Palaeocapulus acutirostre – or unidentified comparable form
 †Palaeocrinus
 †Palaeocrinus hudsoni
 †Palaeocystites – tentative report
 †Palaeolima
 †Palaeolima inequicostata
 †Palaeoneilo
 †Palaeostylus
 †Palaeotextularia
 †Palaeozygopleura
 †Palaeozygopleura parva – tentative report
 †Palecocrinus – tentative report
 †Paleochiton
 †Paleochiton kindbladensis – type locality for species
 †Paleohyperamum – type locality for genus
 †Paleohyperamum pottsvillensis – type locality for species
 †Paleotextularia
 †Paleuthygramma
 †Paleuthygramma acuta – type locality for species
 †Paleyoldia
 †Paleyoldia glabra
 †Palliseria
 †Palliseria robusta
 †Palmerocrinus
 †Palmerocrinus profundus – type locality for species
 †Paltodus
 †Paltodus compressus
 †Pandaspinapyga
 †Pandaspinapyga salsa
 †Panderodus
 †Panderodus equicostatus
 †Panderodus gracilis
 †Panderodus greenlandensis
 †Panderodus panderi
 †Panderodus unicostatus
 †Parabolbina
 †Parabolbina scotti
 †Paraconularia
 †Paracremacrinus
 †Paracremacrinus laticardinalis
 †Paracromyocrinus
 †Paracromyocrinus oklahomensis
 †Paracromyocrinus planatus – type locality for species
 †Paradiabolocrinus
 †Paraechmina
 †Paragassizocrinus
 †Paragassizocrinus tarri
 †Parahealdia
 †Parahealdia quaesita
 †Paralegoceras
 †Paralegoceras iowense
 †Paralegoceras textum
 †Parallelodon
 †Parallelodon vokesi – type locality for species
 †Paramelocrinus
 †Paramelocrinus ubaghsi
 †Paramphicrinus
 †Paraparchites
 †Paraparchites circulantis
 †Paraparchites elongatus – or unidentified comparable form
 †Paraparchites wapanuckensis
 †Parapermopsylla – type locality for genus
 †Parapermopsylla tricubita – type locality for species
 †Parapostibulla
 †Parapostibulla graysoni – type locality for species
 †Paraprisca
 †Paraprisca fragilis
 †Pararchaeocrinus
 †Pararchaeocrinus decoratus
 †Parasaccites
 †Parasaccites korbaenis
 †Paraschmidtella
 †Parastrophinella
 †Parastrophinella lepida
 †Parazophocrinus
 †Parazophocrinus callosus
 †Parelmoa – type locality for genus
 †Parelmoa obtusa – type locality for species
 †Parelmoa radialis – type locality for species
 †Parelmoa revelata – type locality for species
 †Parulrichia
 †Parulrichia haragenensis
 †Pasawioops – type locality for genus
 †Pasawioops mayi – type locality for species
 †Passalocrinus
 †Paucicrura
 †Paucicrura oklahomensis
 †Paucicrura rogata – or unidentified comparable form
 †Paurorthis
 †Paurorthis macrodeltoidea
  †Pecopteris
 †Pecopteris cyathea
 †Pecopteris geinitzi
 †Pecopteris hemitelioides
 †Pecopteris miltonii
 †Pecopteris plumosa-dentata – informal
 †Pecopteris sarefolia
 †Pelidocrinus
 †Pelidocrinus exiguus
 †Peltabellia
 †Peltabellia implexa
 †Peltacrinus
 †Peltacrinus sculptatus
 †Penicillicrinus
 †Penniretepora
 †Penniretepora ardmorensis – type locality for species
 †Pennsylvanioxylon
 †Pentameroides
  †Pentremites
 †Periglyptocrinus
 †Periglyptocrinus priscus
 †Perimestocrinus
 †Perimestocrinus teneris
 †Peripetoceras
 †Permoberotha
 †Permoberotha villosa – tentative report
 †Permoblattina
 †Permoblattina curta
 †Permocoleus – type locality for genus
 †Permocoleus wellingtonensis – type locality for species
 †Permopanorpa
 †Permopanorpa inaequalis
 †Permophorus
 †Permophorus albequus
 †Permophorus immaturis
 †Permophorus mexicanus
 †Permopsylla
 †Permopsylla americana – tentative report
 †Perrinites
 †Perrinites hilli
 †Perryella – type locality for genus
 †Perryella olsoni – type locality for species
  †Petalodus
 †Petigurus
 †Petigurus cullisoni
 †Petraia – tentative report
 †Petraster
 †Petrocrania
 †Petrocrania inflata
 †Phacellopegma
 †Phacellopegma schizoderma
 †Phacelocrinus
 †Phacelocrinus brevis – type locality for species
 †Phacelocrinus rosei
 †Phanassymetria
 †Phanassymetria quadrupla
 †Phanassymetria triserrata
 †Phanelactis
 †Phaneroneura – type locality for genus
 †Phaneroneura martynovae – type locality for species
 †Phaneroneura reducta – type locality for species
 †Phanocrinus
 †Phanocrinus alexanderi – type locality for species
 †Pharkidonotus
 †Pharkidonotus percarinatus
 †Phenopterum
 †Phenopterum elongatum
 †Phestia
 †Phestia inflata
 †Philhedra
 †Phillipsia – tentative report
 †Phimocrinus
 †Pholidocidaris – tentative report
 †Pholidocidaris irregularis – or unidentified comparable form
 †Phragmodus
 †Phragmodus inflexus
 †Phragmodus undatus
 †Phragmolites
 †Phricodothyris
 †Phyloblatta
 †Phyloblatta curvata
 †Phymatopleura
 †Phymatopleura heteropleura – type locality for species
 †Phymatopleura nodosa
 †Pidelocrinus
 †Pidelocrinus planus
 †Pilosisporites
 †Pilosisporites aculeolatus
 †Pilosisporites williamsii
   †Pinnularia
 †Pirocystella
 †Pisocrinus
 †Pisocrinus quinquelobus
 †Pisocrinus spatulatus
 †Pisocrinus spatulus
 †Pisocrinus tennesseensis
 †Pityosporites
 †Pityosporites westphalensis
 †Placotriplesia
 †Placotriplesia praecipta
  †Plaesiomys
 †Plaesiomys bellistriatus
 †Plaesiomys proavitus
 †Plaesiomys subquadrata
 †Plagioglypta
 †Plagioglypta annulostriatum
 †Planisporites
 †Planobola
 †Planobola macrogota
   †Platyceras
 †Platyceras subelegans
  †Platycrinites
 †Platycystites
 †Platycystites bassleri
 †Platycystites bromidensis
 †Platycystites faberi
 †Platycystites fimbriatus
 †Platycystites infundus
 †Platycystites levatus
 †Platyfundocrinus
 †Platyfundocrinus webbersensis – type locality for species
 †Platymena – tentative report
 †Platymena bellatula
 †Platyrhomboides
 †Platyrhomboides quadratus
 †Platysaccus
 †Platysaccus papilionis
 †Platysaccus saarensis
    †Platysomus
 †Platysomus palmaris – or unidentified comparable form
  †Platystrophia
 †Platystrophia prima
 †Platystrophia sutherlandi
 †Platystrophia uncinata
 †Plectambonites
 †Plectambonites sericeus
 †Plectodonta
 †Plectodonta petila
 †Plectoglossa
 †Plectoglossa oklahomensis
 †Plectorthis
 †Plectorthis punctata
 †Plectorthis symmetrica
 †Pleuracanthus
 †Pleuracanthus gracilis
  †Pleurocystites
 †Pleurocystites watkinsi
 †Plicochonetes
 †Pliomerops
 †Pliomerops canadensis – or unidentified comparable form
 †Pluchratia
 †Plummericrinus
 †Plummericrinus expansus – type locality for species
 †Poikilofusa
 †Poikilofusa plethysticha
 †Polidevcia
 †Polidevcia bellistriata
 †Polidevcia vaseyana – or unidentified comparable form
 †Poloniella
 †Poloniella chaleurensis – or unidentified comparable form
 †Polyancistrodorus
 †Polyancistrodorus columbariferus
 †Polycaulodus
 †Polycaulodus bidentatus
 †Polycaulodus tridentatus
 †Polycladiopora
 †Polycladiopora pinnata – or unidentified comparable form
 †Polydeltoideus
 †Polydeltoideus enodatus
 †Polygnathodella – type locality for genus
 †Polygnathodella ouachitensis – type locality for species
 †Polygnathoides
 †Polygnathoides siluricus
 †Polygnathus
 †Polygnathus wapanuckensis – type locality for species
 †Polylophothylax
 †Polylophothylax crossii
 †Polyplacognathus
 †Polyplacognathus sweeti
 †Polypora
 †Polypora debilis – type locality for species
 †Polypora ovicellata – type locality for species
 †Polytylites
 †Polytylites coryelli – type locality for species
 †Polytylites kellettae – type locality for species
 †Polytylites levinsoni – type locality for species
 †Porocrinus
 †Porocrinus bromidensis
 †Postibulla
 †Postibulla westergaardi – type locality for species
 †Poteriocrinus – tentative report
 †Potonieisporites
 †Potonieisporites simplex – type locality for species
 †Praecursoricrinus
 †Praecursoricrinus sulphurensis
 †Praepleurocystis
 †Praepleurocystis watkinsi
 †Prasopora
 †Prasopora fritzae
 †Primitiella
 †Primitiella varicata
 †Primitiopsis
 †Primitiopsis bassleri
 †Primitiopsis elegans
 †Primitiopsis excavatus
 †Primitiopsis minutus
 †Prioniodus
 †Prioniodus altodus – type locality for species
 †Prioniodus gerdae
 †Prismopora
 †Proallosocrinus
 †Proallosocrinus exemptus – type locality for species
 †Proallosocrinus glenisteri – type locality for species
 †Probnis
 †Probnis speciosa
 †Probolichas
 †Prodentalium
 †Productella
 †Productella recensis – type locality for species
 †Productus
 †Productus parvus
 †Productus stehlii – type locality for species
  †Proetus
 †Proetus foculus
 †Progoneura
 †Progoneura grimaldii – type locality for species
 †Progoneura nobilis – type locality for species
 †Progoneura venula – type locality for species
 †Prokopicrinus
 †Prokopicrinus laevis
 †Prokopicrinus tuberculatus
 †Promopalaeaster
 †Proshumardites
 †Protencrinus
 †Protencrinus atoka – type locality for species
 †Protereisma
 †Protereisma arcuatum – or unidentified comparable form
 †Protereisma latum
 †Prothalassoceras
 †Prothalassoceras inexpectans – type locality for species
 †Prothyris
 †Prothyris soleniformis – type locality for species
 †Protocaptorhinus
 †Protocaptorhinus pricei
 †Protohaploxypinus
 †Protohaploxypinus duivenii
 †Protohaploxypinus rugosus
 †Protohaploxypinus samoilovichii
 †Protohaploxypinus suchonensis – or unidentified comparable form
 †Protohymen
 †Protohymen anomalus – type locality for species
 †Protohymen bifurcatus – type locality for species
 †Protohymen curvatus – type locality for species
 †Protohymen largus – type locality for species
 †Protohymen latus – type locality for species
 †Protohymen pictus – type locality for species
 †Protohymen readi
 †Protohymen shafferi – type locality for species
 †Protohymen venustus – type locality for species
 †Protozyga
 †Protozyga loeblichi
 †Prouddenites
 †Prouddenites primus
 †Pseodorthoceras
 †Pseudelmoa – type locality for genus
 †Pseudelmoa ampla – type locality for species
 †Pseudoconocardium
 †Pseudocryptophyllum – or unidentified comparable form
 †Pseudodielasma
 †Pseudodielasma perplexa
 †Pseudoiasvia – type locality for genus
 †Pseudoiasvia sinuosa – type locality for species
 †Pseudolingula
 †Pseudolingula elegantula – or unidentified comparable form
 †Pseudolingula imperfecta
 †Pseudomera
 †Pseudomera barrandei
 †Pseudomonotis – tentative report
 †Pseudomulceodens
 †Pseudomulceodens cancellatus – or unidentified related form
 †Pseudoolenoides
 †Pseudoolenoides acicaudus
 †Pseudoolenoides carterensis – type locality for species
 †Pseudoolenoides derbyi – type locality for species
 †Pseudooneotodus
 †Pseudooneotodus bicornis
 †Pseudooneotodus linguicornis
 †Pseudoparalegoceras
 †Pseudoparalegoceras brazoense
 †Pseudopronorites
 †Pseudopronorites arkansasense
 †Pseudopronorites quinni
 †Pseudorthoceras
 †Pseudorthoceras knoxense
 †Pseudosyrinx
 †Pseudosyrinx missouriensis – or unidentified comparable form
 †Pseudothoceras
 †Pseudozygopleura
 †Pseudozygopleura multicostata – tentative report
 †Pseudozygopleura peoriense
 †Pseudozygopleura plebium – tentative report
 †Pseudozygopleura scitula
 †Psilokirkbyella
 †Psilokirkbyella magnopuncata
 †Psophosphaera
 †Psophosphaera greeri
 †Pteroconus – tentative report
 †Pteroconus abbreviatus
 †Pteronites
 †Pteronites angustatus – or unidentified comparable form
 †Pterotocrinus – tentative report
 †Pterotocrinus springerensis – type locality for species
 †Ptychocladia
 †Ptychocladia bassleri
 †Ptychopleurella
 †Ptychopleurella rugiplicata
 †Pudoproetus
 †Pudoproetus chappelensis
 †Pulchratia
 †Pulchrilamina
 †Pulchrilamina spinosa
 †Punctaparchites
 †Punctaparchites rugosus
 †Punctatisporites
 †Punctatisporites flavus
 †Punctatisporites glaber
 †Punctatisporites minutus
 †Punctatosporites
 †Punctatosporites minutus
 †Punctospirifer
 †Punctospirifer kentuckensis
 †Punctospirifer subtexta
 †Punctospirifer transversa
 †Punctothyris
 †Punctothyris kenwoodensis
 †Punka
 †Punka akoura
 †Punka verecunda
 †Pustula
 †Pustula kenwoodensis – type locality for species
 †Pustula oklahomae – type locality for species
 †Pycnopora
 †Pycnopora ovatipora – type locality for species
 †Pygmaeocrinus
 †Pyrgocystis

Q

 †Quadrocystis
 †Quadrocystis graffhami

R

 †Raaschia – type locality for genus
 †Raaschia oklahomensis – type locality for species
 †Rafinesquina
 †Raistrickia
 †Raistrickia abdita
 †Raistrickia aculeata
 †Raistrickia aculeolata
 †Raistrickia breveinens
 †Raistrickia crinita
 †Raistrickia crocea
 †Rakverella – tentative report
 †Ranapeltis
 †Ranapeltis rowlandi – type locality for species
 †Ranasasus
 †Ranasasus brevicephalus
 †Ranasasus colossus
 †Ranasasus conicus
 †Randaynia
 †Randaynia leatherburyi
 †Raphistoma
 †Rayella
 †Rayella calvini
 †Rayella parva
 †Raymondites
 †Rayonnoceras
 †Rayonnoceras vaughanianum – type locality for species
 †Rectifenestella
 †Rectifenestella tenax
 †Redstonia
 †Redstonia cooperi
 †Reedops
 †Reedops deckeri
 †Regulaecystis
 †Remopleurides
 †Renalcis
 †Renaultia
 †Rensselaerina
 †Rensselaerina haraganana
 Reophax
 †Reophax oacuhitensis – type locality for species
 †Resserella
 †Resserella brownsportensis
 †Reteocrinus
 †Reteocrinus depressus – type locality for species
 †Reticestus – tentative report
 †Reticestus retiferus
 †Reticulaiina
 †Reticulariina
 †Reticulatisporites
 †Reticulatisporites reticulatus
 †Reticulopteris
 †Reticulopteris muensteri
 †Retispira
 †Retispira meekiana
 †Retispira reticulata – type locality for species
 †Rhabdomeson
 †Rhabdomeson foerstei – type locality for species
 †Rhabdomeson rogersi – type locality for species
 †Rhabdomeson ulrichi – type locality for species
 †Rhipidomella
 †Rhipidomella acutisulcata – type locality for species
 †Rhipidomella diminutiva
 †Rhipidomella henryhousensis – type locality for species
 †Rhipidomella oklahomensis – type locality for species
 †Rhipidomella subtriangularis – type locality for species
 †Rhipidomelloides
 †Rhipidomelloides oblata
 †Rhiptosocherma
 †Rhiptosocherma improcera
 †Rhizomaspora – type locality for genus
 †Rhizomaspora divaricata – type locality for species
 †Rhizomaspora lemniscata – type locality for species
 †Rhizomaspora radiata – type locality for species
 †Rhizomospora
 †Rhizophyllum
 †Rhombocladia
 †Rhombopora
 †Rhombopora johnsvalleyensis – type locality for species
 †Rhombopora nitidula – type locality for species
 †Rhopalia
 †Rhopalia catenata
  †Rhynchonkos
 †Rhynchonkos stovalli – type locality for species
 †Rhynchopora
 †Rhynchopora kollari – type locality for species
 †Rhynchopora persinuata
 †Rhynchospirina
 †Rhynchospirina maxwelli – type locality for species
 †Rhynchotrema
 †Rhynchotrema increbescens – tentative report
 †Richardsonites
 †Richardsonites richardsonianus – type locality for species
 †Rishona
  Rogerella
 †Rollia
 †Rollia goodwini
 Rostricellula
 †Rostricellula cuneata
 †Rothella
 †Rothella haraganensis – type locality for species
 †Rothella obliqua
 †Rothella recta
 †Rothianiscus
 †Rothianiscus robusta – type locality for species
 †Roundyella
 †Roundyella bellatula
 †Rowleyella
 †Rowleyella fabulites
 †Rugosochinetes
 †Rugosochonetes
 †Rugosochonetes multicostus

S

 †Saccocrinus
 †Saccocrinus benedicti
 †Saffordotaxis
 †Sagenodus
 †Sagenodus vinslovi
 †Sandia
 †Sanguinolites
 †Sanguinolites omalianus
 †Sanguinolites raleighensis
 †Sanguinolites simulans
 †Sansabella
 †Sansabella keslingi – type locality for species
 †Sansabella truncata – or unidentified comparable form
 †Sansabelloides
 †Sargentina
 †Sargentina allani – or unidentified comparable form
 †Saucrophyllum
 †Scaphiocrinus – tentative report
 †Schellwienella
 †Schellwienella marcidula
 †Schistoceras
 †Schistoceras unicum – type locality for species
 †Schizambon
 †Schizambon perspinosum
 †Schizodus
 †Schizodus chesterensis
 †Schizodus ovatus
 †Schizodus texanus
 †Schizonema
 †Schizonema hami
 †Schizophoria
 †Schizophoria mayesensis – type locality for species
 †Schmidtella
 †Schmidtella affinis
 †Schmidtella asymmetrica
 †Schmidtella brevis
 †Schmidtella crassimarginata
 †Schmidtella excavata
 †Schmidtella minuta
 †Schmidtella ovalis
 †Schmidtella transversa
 †Schopfipollenites
 †Schopfipollenites signatus – type locality for species
 †Schuchertella
 †Schuchertella attentuata
 †Schuchertella haraganensis
 †Sciadiocrinus
 †Sciadiocrinus cascus – type locality for species
 †Sciadiocrinus crassacanthus
 †Sciadiocrinus planulatus
 †Scolecia
 †Scolecia filosa
 †Scolecopteris
 †Scolecopteris altissima
 †Scolecopteris gnoma
 †scolerodont
 †Scolopodus
 †Scolopodus oklahomensis – type locality for species
 †Scolopodus striatum – type locality for species
 †Scutepustula
 †Scutepustula arctifossa
 †Scyphocrinites
  †Scytalocrinus
 †Scytalocrinus crassibrachiatus – type locality for species
 †Scytalocrinus sansabensis
 †Sedgwickia
 †Sedgwickia rugosa – type locality for species
 †Seminolites
 †Seminolites kosomensis – type locality for species
 †Seminolites perforatus – type locality for species
 †Seminolites pushmatahensis – type locality for species
 †Seminolithes
 †Seminolithes clarkei – type locality for species
 †Senftenbergia
 †Septimyalina
 †Septimyalina burmai
 †Septopora
     †Seymouria
 †Seymouria baylorensis
 †Shaleria – tentative report
 †Shansiella
 †Shansiella carbonaria – tentative report
 †Shumardoceras
 †Sibyrhynchus
 †Sieberella
 †Sieberella roemeri
 †Sievertsia
   †Sigillaria
 †Sigmophlebia – type locality for genus
 †Sigmophlebia engeli – type locality for species
 †Sillerpeton – type locality for genus
 †Sillerpeton permianum – type locality for species
 †Sinclairocystis
 †Sinclairocystis angulatus
 †Sinclairocystis praedicta
 †Sinclairocystis sulphurensis
 †Sinuitina
 †Sinuitina cordiformis – type locality for species
 †Sinuopea
 †Sinuopea basiplanata
 †Sinuopea vera
 †Siphonocrinus
 †Siphonocrinus dignus
 †Skenidioides
 †Skenidioides henryhousensis
 †Skenidioides oklahomensis
 †Skenidioides perfectus
 †Skenidium
 †Skenidium insigne
  Solecurtus
 †Solecurtus gardneri – type locality for species
  Solemya – report made of unidentified related form or using admittedly obsolete nomenclature
 †Soleniscus
 †Soleniscus primigenia
 †Soleniscus regularis
 †Solenochilus
 †Solenomorpha – tentative report
 †Solenomorpha nitida – or unidentified comparable form
 †Somoholites
 †Sowerbyella
 †Sowerbyella indistincta
 †Sowerbyella plicatifera
 †Sowerbyella variabilis
 †Sowerbyella vulgata
 †Sowerbyites
 †Sowerbyites hami
 †Sowerbyites lamellosus
 †Spaniocrinus
 †Speyeris
 †Speyeris hami
  †Sphaerexochus
 †Sphaerexochus glaber
 †Sphaerirhynchia
 †Sphaerirhynchia glomerosa – type locality for species
 †Sphaerirhynchia lindenensis
 †Sphaerocoryphe
 †Sphaerodoma
 †Sphaerodoma gracilis
 †Sphaerolepis
 †Sphaerolepis arctata
  †Sphenophyllum
 †Sphenophyllum emarginatum
 †Sphenophyllum gilmorei
 †Sphenophyllum latifolium – or unidentified comparable form
 †Sphenophyllum obovatum
 †Sphenophyllum stoukenbergi – tentative report
  †Sphenopteris
 †Sphenopteris macilenta
 †Spinobairdia
 †Spinocarinifera
 †Spinocarinifera semicostata
 †Spinosporites
 †Spinosporites exiguus
  †Spirifer
 †Spirifer casteri – type locality for species
 †Spirifer grimesi
 †Spirifer opimus
 †Spiriferellina
 †Spirillina
 †Spirillina bendensis – type locality for species
  Spirorbis
 †Spirorbis elegans – type locality for species
 †Spongophylloides
 †Squamularia
 †Stacheia
 †Stacheia congesta
 †Staffella
 †Stegerhynchus
 †Stegerhynchus carmelensis
 †Stegerhynchus clairensis
 †Stegerhynchus concinna
 †Stegnopsis
 †Stegnopsis erythragora – type locality for species
 †Stegnopsis wellingensis – type locality for species
 †Stegocoelia
 †Stellarocrinus
 †Stellarocrinus cuneatus
 †Stenocladia – tentative report
 †Stenocladia bassleri
 †Stenopecrinus
 †Stenopecrinus ornatus – type locality for species
 †Stenopora
 †Stephanozyga
 †Steptognathodus
 †Stereobrachicrinus – type locality for genus
 †Stereobrachicrinus pustullosus – type locality for species
 †Stereostylus
 †Stereostylus perversus
 †Stictopora
 †Stictopora fenestrata
 †Strabocystis – type locality for genus
 †Strabocystis fayi – type locality for species
 †Straparollus
 †Straparolous
 †Straparolous catilloides
 †Straparolous catiloides
 †Streblochondria – tentative report
 †Streblochondria tenuilineata
 †Strebloplax – type locality for genus
 †Strebloplax crustacea – type locality for species
 †Streblotrypa
 †Streblotrypa nicklesi
 †Streptognathodus
 †Streptorhynchus
 †Striatites
 †Striatites richteri
 †Striatopodocarpites
 †Striatopodocarpites caricicostatus
 †Striatopodocarpites communis
 †Striatopodocarpites olsonii
 †Strigigenalis
 †Strigigenalis caudata
 †Strigigenalis crassimarginata
 †Strigigenalis derbyi
 †Strigigenalis implexa
 †Strigigenalis insentis
 †Strigigenalis knighti – or unidentified comparable form
 †Strimplecystis – type locality for genus
 †Strimplecystis oklahomensis – type locality for species
 †Strixella
 †Strixella acutisulcata
 †Strobeus
 †Strobeus brevis
 †Strobeus gouldiana – type locality for species
 †Strobeus intercalaris
 †Strobeus paludinaeformis
 †Stroboceras
 †Stroboceras furnishi – type locality for species
 †Stromatotrypa
 †Stromatotrypa frondosa
 †Strongylocrinus
 †Strongylocrinus hansoni – type locality for species
 †Strongylocrinus ornatus – type locality for species
 †Strophochonetes
   †Strophomena
 †Strophomena clermontensis
 †Strophomena costellata
 †Strophomena crinerensis
 †Strophomena neglecta
 †Strophomena oklahomensis
 †Strophomena perconcava – or unidentified comparable form
 †Strophomena planumbona
 †Strophomena trentonensis
 †Strophonella
 †Strophonella alterniradiata
 †Strophonella bransoni – type locality for species
 †Strophonella laxiplicata
 †Strophonella loeblichi
 †Strophonella prolongata
 †Strophostylus
 †Strotersporites – type locality for genus
 †Strotersporites communis – type locality for species
 †Stylocrinus
 †Sulcatisporites
 †Sulcatisporites potoniei
 †Sylvohymen
 †Sylvohymen ingens – type locality for species
 †Synchirocrinus
 †Synchirocrinus divisus
 †Synchirocrinus quadratus
 †Synerocrinus
 †Synerocrinus farishi
 †Syngastrioceras
 †Syngastrioceras clinei – type locality for species
 †Syngastrioceras scotti
 †Syringaxon

T

 †Tabulipora
 †Tabulipora macnairi – type locality for species
 †Tabulipora simplex – type locality for species
 †Tabulipora tuberculata – or unidentified comparable form
 †Taeniaesporites
 †Taeniaesporites noviaulensis – or unidentified comparable form
 †Taeniopteris
 †Taeniopteris abnormis
 †Taeniopteris multinervis
 †Tainoceras
 †Tainoceras murrayi
 †Tanaocystis
 †Tanaocystis watkinsi
 †Tarphyceras
 †Tarphyceras chadwickense
 †Teguliferina
 †Teguliferina parva – type locality for species
 †Tegulocrea
 †Tegulocrea incerta
 †Teiichispira
 †Teiichispira affinis – or unidentified comparable form
 †Tellinomorpha
 †Tellinomorpha schencki – type locality for species
   †Tentaculites
 †Terpnocrinus
 †Tersomius
 †Tersomius dolesensis – type locality for species
 †Tersomius mosesi – type locality for species
 †Tersomius texensis – or unidentified comparable form
 †Tetradellina
 †Tetradellina henningsmoeni
 †Tetrataxis
 †Tetrataxis decurrens – or unidentified comparable form
 †Tetrataxis lata
  Textularia
 †Textularia grahamensis – or unidentified comparable form
 †Thalamocrinus
 †Thalamocrinus elongatus
 †Thalattocanthus
 †Thalattocanthus consonus
 †Thaleops
 †Thaleops jaanussoni
 †Thallograptus
 †Thamniscus
 †Thamniscus erectus – type locality for species
 †Thigriffides
 †Thigriffides roundyi
 †Thlipsura
 †Thlipsura furca
 †Thlipsurella
 †Thlipsurella fossata
 †Thlipsurella muricurva
 †Thlipsurella murrayensis – type locality for species
 †Thlipsurella putea
 †Thlipsuroides
 †Thomasatia
 †Thomasatia auricula
 †Thomasatina
 †Thomasatina bromidensis
 †Thomasatina simplex
 †Thoracoceras
 †Thrausmosaurus – type locality for genus
 †Thrausmosaurus serratidens – type locality for species
 †Thuroholia
 †Thuroholia crinerensis
 †Thuroholia croneisi
 †Thuroholia overbrookensis
 †Thymnospora
 †Thymnospora pseudothiessenii – or unidentified comparable form
 †Thymospora
 †Thymospora pseudothiessenii
 †Tolypammina
 †Torispora
 †Torispora securis
 †Torynifer
 †Trematospira
 †Trematospira costata – or unidentified comparable form
 †Trematospira hippolyte – or unidentified comparable form
 †Trepospira
 †Trepospira depressa
 †Trigonirhynchia
 †Trigonirhynchia acutirostella
     †Trimerorhachis
 †Trimerorhachis insignis
 †Triquitrites
 †Triquitrites additus
 †Triquitrites bransonii
 †Triquitrites exiguus
 †Triquitrites sculptilis
 †Triquitrites spinosus
 †Triquitrites subspinosus
 †Triquitrites tribullatus
 †Tririctus – type locality for genus
 †Tririctus reticulatus – type locality for species
 †Tritonoceras
 †Trochonodella
 †Trochonodella obtusa
 †Trochosporites – type locality for genus
 †Trochosporites reniformis – type locality for species
 †Trucherognathus
 †Trucherognathus distorta
 †Trucherognathus irregularis
 †Tryplasma
 †Tuberculatosporites
 †Tuberculatosporites robustus
 †Tubulibairdia
 †Tubulibairdia simplex
 †Tupus
 †Tupus gracilis – type locality for species
 †Turgidacystis – type locality for genus
 †Turgidacystis graffhami – type locality for species
 †Turrilepas
 †Turrilepas whithersi – type locality for species

U

 †Ulocrinus
 †Ulrichia
 †Ulrichidiscus
 †Ulrichidiscus forbesi – type locality for species
 †Unibothriocidaris
  †Urasterella
 †Utharocrinus
 †Utharocrinus pentanodus

V

 †Valcourea
 †Valcourea transversa
  †Varanodon – type locality for genus
 †Varanodon agilis – type locality for species
    †Varanops
 †Varanops brevirostris – or unidentified comparable form
 †Veliberychia
 †Vermiporella – tentative report
 †Verrucosisporites
 †Verrucosisporites grandiverrucosus
 †Verrucosisporites microtuberosus
 †Verrucosisporites verrucosus – or unidentified comparable form
 †Veryhachium
 †Veryhachium bromidense
 †Veryhachium irroratum
 †Vesicaspora
 †Vesicaspora schemelii
 †Vesicaspora wilsonii
 †Vestispora
 †Vestispora fenestrata
 †Vestispora foveata
 †Vestispora pseudoreticulata
 †Vestispora wanlessii
 †Victoriacystis
 †Victoriacystis holmesorum – or unidentified related form
 †Villosacapsula
 †Villosacapsula entriche
 †Vinella
 †Vinella bilineata – type locality for species
 †Virginiata
 †Virginiata arkansana
 †Vittatina
 †Vittatina costabilis – type locality for species
 †Vittatina lata – type locality for species
 †Vittatina simplex
 †Vittatina verrucosa
 †Vogdesia
 †Vogdesia bromidensis
 †Voiseyella
 †Voiseyella novamexicana

W

 †Waagenella
 †Waagenella crassus – or unidentified comparable form
   †Walchia
 †Walchia gracilis – or unidentified comparable form
 †Walchia imbricata – tentative report
 †Walliserodus
  †Watongia – type locality for genus
 †Watongia meieri – type locality for species
 †Wedekindellina
 †Wellerella
 †Wellergyi
 †Wellergyi brazerianum
 †Wellerites
 †Wellerites mohri
 †Wewokella
 †Wewokella solida
 †Wewokites
 †Wewokites venatus
 †Whitspakia
 †Whitspakia schucherti
 †Wichitoceras
 †Wichitoceras crassum
 †Wichitoceras decipiens
 †Wiedeyoceras
 †Wilkingia
 †Wilkingia rothi
 †Wilsonites
 †Wilsonites delicatus
 †Wilsonites vesicatus
 †Winchellatina
 †Winchellatina cornuta
 †Winchellatina longispina
 †Worthenia
 †Worthenia tabulata
 †Wurmiella
 †Wurmiella excavata
 †Wurmiella posthamata

X

  †Xenacanthus

Y

 †Yochelsonospira
 †Yochelsonospira thomasi – type locality for species
 Yoldia
 †Youngiella
 †Youngiella wapanuckensis – type locality for species

Z

 †Zaphrentites
 †Zaphrentites arkansanus
  †Zatrachys
 †Zatrachys serratus
 †Zeilleria
 †Zelophyllum
 †Zenocrinus
 †Zenocrinus zeus – type locality for species
 †Zonalasporites
 †Zonalasporites punctaticus – type locality for species
 †Zonalasporites punctatus
 †Zophocrinus
 †Zophocrinus angulatus
 †Zosterosporites
 †Zosterosporites triangularis
 †Zygopleura
 †Zygopteris
 †Zygopteris illinoiensis

References

 

Paleozoic
Oklahoma